Caja de Ahorros de Murcia or Caja Murcia is a Spanish saving bank. It was founded on September 23, 1964.

Headquartered in Murcia. This is the first financial institution in the Region of Murcia.

Branches
 Region of Murcia: 266
 Province of Alicante: 91
 Province of Valencia: 31
 Province of Almería: 28
 Province of Albacete: 23
 Madrid: 4
 Province of Cuenca: 3
 Province of Castellón: 2

External links
 Official website

Defunct banks of Spain
Banks established in 1964